George Marshall Louden (6 September 1885 – 28 December 1972) was an Essex cricketer who was for a period after World War I almost certainly the best hard-wicket bowler in England. Even on the exquisite Leyton pitches, he was able to pick up speed and lift the ball sharply, and it could be very challenging if there was a heavy dew or rain that softened the ground.

However, owing to business commitments, most of Louden's cricket was played for the Ilford club. Typically he was able to play seven or eight county matches per season. Because the matches he did play were usually against the strongest batting sides like Surrey, Yorkshire, Middlesex and Lancashire, Louden's career average of 22.35 does not look at all exceptional for an era of uncovered pitches. However, owing to the immense disparities in batting strength among the counties during the 1920s, Louden's average represents much better bowling than many bowlers with much lower averages against weak opposition. Business meant Louden never had the tiniest hope of going on a tour to Australia, though he was doubtless much better suited to the cast-iron Australian pitches than any English professional bowler of the time.

Louden first played for Essex in 1912 at a time when Essex bowling was very weak with Buckenham's and Mead's careers nearly over. Despite a couple of promising performances in 1913 and 1914, it was not until 1919 that Louden showed his true class with seven for 42 on an excellent pitch against Lancashire and eight for 122 on a similarly good wicket against Sussex. His 66 wickets for 25 each looked nothing out of the common, but on featherbed Leyton pitches such figures constituted first-rate bowling, and he was picked for the Gentlemen at Lord's and The Oval but was overshadowed by his teammate Johnny Douglas, taking only one wicket in two games.

In 1920 Louden was seen as disappointing with an average of over 27 (though this was largely due to the excellent pitches and only playing against strong counties), but in the following two years he performed so well on his limited appearances as to leave little doubt that he was the best bowler in England. His performance for the Gentlemen at Lord's in 1922 was the best bowling by an Englishman since Sydney Barnes was in his prime, whilst he was equally good against Surrey at The Oval in both 1922 and 1923 (with innings analyses of seven for 84 and six for 66 on perfect pitches). Despite this performance, he did not gain a Wisden Cricketer of the Year nomination. Although Louden bowled against the Australians in 1921 and took thirteen wickets in two innings, he was not chosen for any Test match, yet most historians believe his omission for Howell and Durston was a major error. Australian batsman Warren Bardsley thought it ridiculous that, although the England selectors went through fourteen bowlers that series, they never once turned to the man the Australians regarded as the best in the country.  "All we did was tell the truth," he said later.  "We told everybody that Louden was England's best bowler. They thought we were leg-pulling and just didn't pick him!" Bardsley and Herbie Collins were always at pains to give one another the strike when Louden was bowling.

After 1922, Louden declined somewhat even though he could play a little more often than before. He still remained a formidable opponent, as shown against the South Africans in 1924 when he took ten wickets, and on a bad wicket at Lord's in 1925 with nine for 67. He played almost no cricket after 1925, but was fondly remembered by those who played with him as a bowler who deserved much higher honours than business permitted him to obtain.

References

1885 births
1972 deaths
People from Forest Gate
English cricketers
Marylebone Cricket Club cricketers
Essex cricketers
Gentlemen cricketers
North v South cricketers
English cricketers of 1919 to 1945